Ferryhill School (formerly Ferryhill Business And Enterprise College and before that Ferryhill Comprehensive School) is a coeducational secondary school located in Ferryhill, County Durham, England. The school specialises in Business and Enterprise.

Previously a community school administered by Durham County Council, in May 2018 Ferryhill Business And Enterprise College converted to academy status. The school is now sponsored by, and hosts, the Eden Learning Trust.

References

External links
Ferryhill School official website

Eden Learning Trust
Secondary schools in County Durham
Academies in County Durham
Ferryhill